Deep Cuts is the second studio album by Swedish electronic music duo the Knife. It was released on 17 January 2003 by Rabid Records. The 2004 version contains three additional tracks (taken from Hannah med H Soundtrack) and is packaged with a DVD containing music videos. On 31 October 2006, Mute Records issued Deep Cuts and the Knife's eponymous debut album in the United States, marking the first US release of both albums. The album spawned the singles "Heartbeats", "You Take My Breath Away" and "Pass This On".

Critical reception

Deep Cuts received critical acclaim. Danielle Brigham of Hot Press compared it to a "soundtrack to a futuristic film that was made in the '80s", saying that "the synths, the drum machines and even the vocals – are distinctly retro but always put to imaginative use." Karin's way of singing was described as "mix of subtlety and parody".

Q included Deep Cuts at number 56 on their "Top 100 Albums of the 2000s" list in 2009.

In 2013, Swedish magazine Sonic placed the album at number four on their list of the "100 Best Swedish Albums Ever". The list was compiled by 150 musicians, journalists and music industry insiders.

Track listing

Swedish and European special edition

2006 UK special edition

US edition

Personnel
Credits adapted from the liner notes of Deep Cuts.

 The Knife – recording, production, mixing, cover design
 Jenny Wilson – vocals 
 Kalle Lekholm – French horn 
 Christoffer Berg – mixing 
 Henrik Jonsson – mastering
 Kristian Andersson – hardware supervision
 Elin Berge – photo

Charts

Weekly charts

Year-end charts

Certifications

Release history

References

2003 albums
The Knife albums
Mute Records albums